Rubus rossbergianus is an uncommon North American species of flowering plant in the rose family. It grows in northeastern United States (Connecticut, Rhode Island, Massachusetts, Vermont).

The genetics of Rubus is extremely complex, so that it is difficult to decide on which groups should be recognized as species. There are many rare species with limited ranges such as this. Further study is suggested to clarify the taxonomy. Some studies have suggested that R. rossbergianus may have originated as a hybrid between R. flagellaris and R. pensilvanicus.

References

rossbergianus
Plants described in 1907
Flora of the Northeastern United States
Flora without expected TNC conservation status